Veronese is the Italian word denoting someone or something from Verona, Italy and may refer to:

 Veronese Riddle, a popular riddle in the Middle Ages 
 Veronese (moth), a moth genus in the family Crambidae
 Monte Veronese, an Italian cheese made from cow's milk
 the Veronese embedding of a projective space by a complete linear system
 Veronese (typeface), Monotype typeface series 59, cut in 1911 for publisher J.M. Dent

Places 

 Velo Veronese, Italy
 Cavaion Veronese, Italy
 Povegliano Veronese, Italy

People 
 Angela Veronese (1778–1847), Italian poet
 Bonifazio Veronese (1487–1553), Italian Renaissance painter
 Paolo Veronese (1528–1588), Italian Renaissance painter in Venice
 Giuseppe Veronese (1854–1917), Italian mathematician
 Joe Alioto Veronese (born 1973), San Francisco politician